~ is the first studio album by Russian progressive chamber band iamthemorning. It was self-released digitally on April 27, 2012. It was made available to download for free by the band who believed that "music has to be available for everyone"; the band only made profit from donations.

Background
The album was self-produced by the band and released in April 2012. In an interview, vocalists Marjana Semkina discussed the techniques used to record the album stating "I won’t reveal the backstage stories too much…[because] a lot of people would be terrified if they knew how we recorded certain things" referring to the subpar conditions under which the album was recorded, maintaining that "at least I know that we did our best". On the title of the album, Semkina described the tilde as "a powerful symbol. It brings us certain associations but all of them are more or less neutral. It’s difficult to keep things clear of additional emotional coloring. We didn’t want people to have any feelings about our album before they got to listen to it. We wanted them to be objective. We wanted them to judge us by our music".

The album was remastered in October 2012 and rereleased as a physical CD.

Track listing

Personnel
iamthemorning
 Gleb Kolyadin – grand piano, keyboards
 Marjana Semkina – vocals

Additional musicians
 Max Roudenko – bass guitar
 Eugene Abzalov – electric guitar, acoustic guitar
 Mikhail Istratov – drums, percussion
 Alina Shilova – cello
 Ilya Dyakov – violin
 Philipp Buin – viola
 Nikita Valamin – shaker, tapping

Production
 Nikita Valamin – engineering, mastering, mixing

References

2012 debut albums
Iamthemorning albums
Self-released albums